Get Nice! may refer to:

 Get Nice! (EP), an EP by Spoon
 Get Nice! (album), an album by Zebrahead